Brushville is an unincorporated community located in the Town of Bloomfield, Waushara County, Wisconsin, United States. The community was founded around 1853 and was named for mill operators Herman and Eliphalet Brush.

Notes

Unincorporated communities in Waushara County, Wisconsin
Unincorporated communities in Wisconsin